Associated Colleges of the Midwest (ACM) is a consortium of 14 private liberal arts colleges, primarily in the Midwestern United States. The 14 colleges are located in five states (Illinois, Iowa, Minnesota, Wisconsin, and Colorado). The ACM was established in 1958 and is headquartered in Chicago. The consortium's current president is Sonya Malunda.

Member colleges
The ACM member colleges are:

Activities
One of the ACM's largest initiatives is coordination of several off-campus study programs, which are available to students at any college or university, though many participants come from the ACM member institutions. Study programs include both domestic programs and international programs (study abroad). ACM off-campus study programs have been offered since 1960. Many programs emphasize off-campus study with a liberal arts perspective.

The following programs are currently offered:

International
Botswana: Development in Southern Africa
Brazil: Semester Exchange Program
Costa Rica: Community Engagement in Public Health, Education, & the Environment
Costa Rica: Field Research in the Environment, Social Sciences, & Humanities
Florence: Arts, Humanities, & Culture
India: Culture, Traditions, & Globalization
India: Development Studies & Hindi Language
India: Summer Service Learning & Cultural Immersion
Japan Study
 Jordan: Middle East & Arabic Language Studies
London & Florence: Arts in Context
Mexico: Summer Service Learning & Language Immersion
Tanzania: Ecology & Human Origins

Domestic
Chicago Program: Arts, Entrepreneurship, & Urban Studies
Newberry Seminar: Research in the Humanities
Oak Ridge Science Semester

External links
Official website

College and university associations and consortia in the United States
.